The 2022 Michigan gubernatorial election took place on November 8, 2022, to elect the governor of Michigan. Incumbent Democratic Governor Gretchen Whitmer ran for re-election to a second term and faced former political commentator Tudor Dixon in the general election. Whitmer defeated Dixon by a vote margin of nearly 11 percentage points, a larger victory than when she was first elected four years prior.

This was the first gubernatorial election in Michigan history in which both major party candidates for governor were women, and the first  since 1990 in which the winner was from the same party as the incumbent president.

Process for ballot appearance and fraud allegations
In order to appear on a primary ballot for the August 2 Democratic and Republican primaries, candidates must submit between 15,000 and 30,000 signatures in addition to their filing paperwork. These signatures are submitted to the Board of State Canvassers, a bipartisan and independent board that verifies petition signatures. Within seven days of the filing deadline, citizens and organizations can challenge nomination signatures submitted by candidates. Voters are only allowed to sign one nomination petition.

After the filing deadline, the Board of State Canvassers received nearly 30 challenges to nomination petitions. Among them, the Michigan Democratic Party alleged that several Republican candidates engaged in signature fraud with their petitions. This was followed by a report by the Michigan Bureau of Elections which alleged that 36 paid signature circulators faked signatures and engaged in practices that added fraudulent signatures to other candidates petitions.

An eight-hour meeting of the Board of State Canvassers reached a deadlock on whether to allow the candidates in question to stay on the ballot. Due to the deadlock, the candidates in question were not allowed to appear on the primary ballot. The rushed pace of the proceedings and the decision were criticized by Common Cause of Michigan, whose policy director suggested that the candidates in question had to plead their cases to the Board of Canvassers days after finding out about the alleged fraud themselves.

Several candidates filed lawsuits appealing the decision. These suits were rejected in the Michigan Court of Appeals. At least two of the candidates involved pledged to appeal their cases to the Michigan Supreme Court.

Democratic primary

Candidates

Nominee
 Gretchen Whitmer, incumbent Governor (2019–present) and Vice Chair of the Democratic National Committee (2021–present)
 Running mate: Garlin Gilchrist, incumbent Lieutenant Governor (2019–present)

Endorsements

Results

Republican primary
Fourteen people declared their candidacy for the Republican gubernatorial nomination. At the filing deadline, 10 candidates submitted enough signatures to appear on the ballot, a state record. However, following challenges by the state Democratic party and other organizations, five candidates were deemed ineligible to appear on the ballot due to alleged fraudulent signatures. Several of these candidates, including former Detroit police chief James Craig and  Michael Markey, pledged to appeal the decision to the State Supreme Court. Craig also mentioned that, should the appeal fail, he would still plan to run as a write-in candidate for both the primary and the general election. On June 15, 2022, Craig announced he was launching a write-in campaign for the nomination.

On June 9, 2022, candidate Ryan Kelley was arrested by the FBI following numerous tips that he had participated in the January 6 United States Capitol attack. The criminal complaint alleges that Kelley engaged in disorderly conduct on restricted grounds and engaged in acts of violence against a person or property.

On August 19, 2022, Dixon announced former state representative Shane Hernandez as her running mate. However, shortly after, former gubernatorial candidates Ralph Rebandt and Garrett Soldano both announced that they were exploring the possibility of launching their own campaigns for Lieutenant Governor to contest Hernandez at the August 27 state GOP convention for not being conservative enough. On August 22, 2022, Soldano announced that he would not seek the position of Lieutenant Governor at the convention. Later that same day, Rebandt announced that he would seek the nomination at the convention. Hernandez secured his party's nomination at the convention, despite heated opposition from supporters of Rebandt.

Candidates

Nominee 

 Tudor Dixon, conservative media personality
 Running mate: Shane Hernandez, former state representative from the 83rd district (2017–2021) and candidate for Michigan's 10th congressional district in 2020

Eliminated in primary
 Ryan Kelley, Allendale Township Planning commissioner
 Running mate: Jamie Swafford, Ethnic Vice-chair of the Michigan Republican Party
 Ralph Rebandt, Farmington Hills pastor
 Kevin Rinke, businessman
 Garrett Soldano, chiropractor, businessman and former co-chairman of Unlock Michigan

Disqualified, write-in campaign
James Craig, former Chief of the Detroit Police Department (2013–2021)

Failed to qualify
 Donna Brandenburg, businesswoman (became U.S. Taxpayers Party Nominee after disqualification)
 Mike Brown, captain in the Michigan State Police(endorsed Kevin Rinke)
 Perry Johnson, businessman
 Michael Jay Markey Jr., businessman and media personality
 Bob Scott, Jelly Maker and Vice President of the Evangelical Alliance Ministerial Association
 Evan Space, Michigan Army National Guard veteran and candidate for governor in 2018

Withdrawn
 Articia Bomer, Detroit document specialist (ran unsuccessfully for Michigan's 13th congressional district)
 Austin Chenge, businessman and U.S. Army veteran

Declined
 Tom Barrett, state senator from the 24th district (2019–present) (running for Michigan's 7th congressional district)
Betsy DeVos, former U.S. Secretary of Education (2017–2021) and former chair of the Michigan Republican Party (1996–2000, 2003–2005)
 John James, businessman, former U.S. Army Captain and Republican nominee for the U.S. Senate in 2018 and 2020 (running for Michigan's 10th congressional district)
Tom Leonard, former Speaker of the Michigan House of Representatives (2017–2019) and nominee for attorney general in 2018 (ran unsuccessfully for attorney general)
 Mike Shirkey, Majority Leader of the Michigan Senate (2019–present) and former state representative from the 65th district (2010–2014) (endorsed Tudor Dixon)

Endorsements

Polling
Graphical summary

Aggregate polls

John James vs. James Craig

Results

Libertarian convention

Candidates

Nominated 
 Mary Buzuma, nominee for governor in 2014
 Running mate: Brian Ellison, nominee for Michigan's 8th congressional district in 2018

Constitution convention

Candidates

Nominee 
 Donna Brandenburg, businesswoman (Nominated following disqualification from GOP ballot)
Running mate: Mellissa Carone, 2020 election hearing witness for Rudy Giuliani

General election

Predictions

Endorsements

Polling
Aggregate polls

Graphical summary

Gretchen Whitmer vs. Ryan Kelley

Gretchen Whitmer vs. Ralph Rebandt

Gretchen Whitmer vs. Kevin Rinke

Gretchen Whitmer vs. Garrett Soldano

Gretchen Whitmer vs. James Craig

Gretchen Whitmer vs. John James

Gretchen Whitmer vs. Candice Miller

Gretchen Whitmer vs. generic Republican

Gretchen Whitmer vs. generic opponent

Debates 

The first debate was held on Thursday, October 13 in Grand Rapids hosted by local TV station WOOD-TV.  The two clashed on various issues such as abortion, the economy and COVID-19. The fact checkers were busy analyzing the claims the two candidates made. Analysts determined this debate to be a draw.

The second debate was held on Tuesday, October 25 on the campus of Oakland University in Rochester. The debate was co-sponsored by Oakland University's Center for Civic Engagement and E.W. Scripps owned TV stations WXYZ-TV in Detroit, WXMI-TV in Grand Rapids and WSYM-TV in Lansing. News stories about the debate specifically noted a question Whitmer gave Dixon when they argued on school safety and library books: "Do you really think books are more dangerous than guns?"

Results

Analysis

Whitmer led Dixon in most of the polls. Most Republican donors chose not to fund campaign ads for Dixon, causing the TV airwaves to be dominated by ads for Whitmer, which included negative ads against Dixon.  Whitmer also spent a lot more in digital advertising compared to Dixon. Abortion rights, which were on the ballot in the same election, were the subject of negative ads against Dixon, who opposed abortion rights. Although aggregate polling had Whitmer up by about 3%, and a last minute poll by Trafalgar Group had Dixon ahead by 1%, the election was not close. Whitmer defeated Dixon at the same time Michigan voters approved a ballot measure that would guarantee abortion rights in the Michigan constitution. Democrats swept the other statewide partisan races and won control of both the state House and state Senate. This marked the first time Democrats took control of both houses of the Michigan legislature since 1984.

Whitmer's victory was attributed to her strong performance in Michigan's most populous counties, which include Wayne (Detroit and Dearborn), Oakland (Pontiac and Troy), Kent (Grand Rapids), Macomb (Warren plus other northern Detroit suburbs), Genesee (Flint), Washtenaw (Ann Arbor and the University of Michigan), Ingham (home to the state capital of Lansing), Kalamazoo, Saginaw, and Muskegon. She also performed well in some more moderately populous places, including Marquette County in the Upper Peninsula and the Traverse City area in the northwestern tip of the Lower Peninsula. Whitmer's wider victory margin was attributed to her increased leads from her previous election in places such as Kent County (4.15% to 10.38%), Oakland County (16.96% to 23.08%), and Washtenaw County (46.14% to 51.48%), solidifying the latter's status as the bluest county in Michigan. Voting by college students also went up, causing long lines at polling places which led to continued voting long after the polls closed at 8 p.m.

Dixon, on the other hand, did well in Michigan's outer suburbs and rural counties. While she improved on 2018 Republican nominee Bill Schuette's performance in moderately populated Monroe and St. Clair counties on the outskirts of Metro Detroit, she saw her leads drop in Livingston County (home to Howell and other Detroit suburbs) from 17.07% to 12.83% and Ottawa County (home to Grand Haven, Holland, and other Grand Rapids suburbs) from 23.57% to 18.04%, further continuing the trend of moderate white suburban voters shifting away from the Republicans and toward the Democrats. 

Through Proposal 3, voters simultaneously enshrined reproductive rights to the State Constitution. Key to Whitmer's win were Macomb County and Oakland County, the former of those being won by Republicans in both the 2016 and 2020 presidential elections. Voters in Oakland County cemented the shift from suburban Republican stronghold into a Democratic stronghold, by giving Whitmer a 150,000 voter margin over Dixon, signaling Oakland County's shift as part of a core Democratic constituency. As Republicans became more politically conservative, the moderate Oakland County has shifted from its Republican roots to a key Democratic county in Michigan elections. Whitmer outperformed Biden by nearly 9 points in her election, and the race somewhat mirrored Proposal 3, which Michigan voters enshrined into their Constitution by a 57%-43% margin. Oakland County's shift from Republican stronghold to a new Democratic stronghold reflects a nationwide shift amongst suburban voters. 

Despite Dixon's loss, she managed to flip Gogebic County in the Upper Peninsula (which had voted for Whitmer in 2018), making this the first election since 1932 where a Democrat won the Michigan Governor's Mansion without carrying Gogebic County. Conversely, Whitmer flipped the counties of Benzie and Grand Traverse.

Notes

Partisan clients

References

External links 
Official campaign websites
 Donna Brandenburg (C) for Governor
 Mary Buzuma (L) for Governor
 Tudor Dixon (R) for Governor
 Gretchen Whitmer (D) for Governor

2022
Michigan
Governor
Gretchen Whitmer